The 1994–95 UEFA Champions League was the 40th edition of UEFA's premier European club football tournament, and the third since its rebranding as the UEFA Champions League. The tournament was won by Ajax of the Netherlands with a late goal in the final against defending champions Milan of Italy. Ajax won the competition without losing a game, either in the group or the knock-out stage in winning the title for the first time since 1973.

Compared to the previous edition of the European Cup, radical changes were made to the format of the tournament, due to a recently expired contract that bound UEFA to the EBU for the transmission of the final. This gave occasion for a general review of the format, which attracted the interest of new and financially well-off private television companies. This edition included four groups of four teams each in the group stage, up from two groups of four teams each in 1993–94. It was also the first year in which eight teams advanced to the knock-out stage and the first of three years in which the champions of smaller nations entered the UEFA Cup instead of the Champions League. It was also the first time that this competition was known as the UEFA Champions League from the first to the last match of the competition: in two previous seasons, the UEFA Champions League involved the matches played between the second round and the European Cup Final.

Federal Republic of Yugoslavia's entrants were unable to participate for the third season in a row due to the UN economic sanctions. Milan were the defending champions, but were defeated by Ajax in the final.

Teams
24 teams entered the competition: the UEFA Champions League holders, AC Milan, as well as 23 best-ranked national champions according to UEFA club ranking. The title holders and other 7 best-ranked national champions received a bye to the group stage, while the national champions ranked 9–24 entered in the qualifying round. The remaining national champions were only allowed to participate in UEFA Cup.

Round and draw dates
The schedule of the competition is as follows. The draw was held in Geneva, Switzerland on 20 July 1994, where qualifying round pairs as well as group formations were drawn. The knockout phase pairs were made automatically by a predetermined bracket.

Qualifying round

|-
!colspan="5"|Group A

|-
!colspan="5"|Group B

|-
!colspan="5"|Group C

|-
!colspan="5"|Group D

|}

Group stage

Ten of the sixteen participating teams made their UEFA Champions League group stage debut: AEK Athens, Ajax, Bayern Munich, Benfica, Casino Salzburg, Dynamo Kyiv, Hajduk Split, Manchester United, Paris Saint-Germain and Steaua București. Two of these teams, Benfica and Dynamo Kyiv, had previously contested the 1991–92 European Cup group stage.
Casino, Hajduk, Manchester United and Steaua were the first teams to qualify for group stage from Austria, Croatia, England and Romania respectively.

Group A

Group B

Group C

Group D

Knockout stage

Bracket

Quarter-finals

|}

Semi-finals

 
|}

Final

Top goalscorers

See also
1994–95 UEFA Cup Winners' Cup
1994–95 UEFA Cup

References

External links
1994–95 All matches – season at UEFA website
 European Cup results at RSSSF
 All scorers 1994–95 UEFA Champions League (excluding qualifying round) according to protocols UEFA
 All scorers qualifying round
 1994/95 UEFA Champions League - results and line-ups (archive)

 
1
UEFA Champions League seasons